The Severn Street Synagogue, founded in 1809 and opened in 1813 as a synagogue in Birmingham, England, is now the Athol Masonic Hall.

History

Severn Street was newly carved out of the former Gooch Estate when the synagogue was founded in 1809.

The synagogue building was completed in 1813, and that year was badly damaged in a riot directed at non-Anglicans that also severely damaged the Methodist Church in Belmont Row, Quaker Meetinghouse near Lady Well,  and the Baptist Chapel in Bond Street.

The synagogue was sold to the Freemasons in 1856 after the construction of the Singers Hill Synagogue.

Architecture

The synagogue was rebuilt by architect Richard Tutin (1796–1832)  in Greek Revival style  1825–1827.  The Torah Ark was retained by the Freemasons with only slight modifications.  Its handsome, fluted Doric columns and classical entablature remain.  The Master's Chair is placed in the former Torah Ark niche.

The adjacent banqueting hall,  decorated with Stars of David, was added for the Freemasons by architect Henry Naden in 1871–2.

See also
 List of former synagogues in the United Kingdom

References

External links 
Birmingham's First Jewish Congregations (to 1856) on Jewish Communities and Records – UK (hosted by jewishgen.org).

1809 establishments in England
1856 disestablishments in England
Former synagogues in England
Greek Revival synagogues
Religious buildings and structures in Birmingham, West Midlands
Synagogues completed in 1813
Synagogues completed in 1827
Masonic buildings